Viktor Andreyevich Aboimov (born 14 September 1949) is a Kazakhstani former swimmer who competed in the 1972 Summer Olympics.

After his retirement, he served as the head of aquatics for Dynamo Alma-Ata and the chairman of the Physical Culture and Sports Committee for the Kazakh Ministry of Tourism and Sports.

References

1949 births
Living people
Kazakhstani male freestyle swimmers
Olympic swimmers of the Soviet Union
Swimmers at the 1972 Summer Olympics
Olympic silver medalists for the Soviet Union
World Aquatics Championships medalists in swimming
European Aquatics Championships medalists in swimming
Medalists at the 1972 Summer Olympics
Olympic silver medalists in swimming
Soviet male freestyle swimmers